Bacon is an unincorporated community in Moniteau County, in the U.S. state of Missouri.

History
A post office called Bacon was established in 1890, and remained in operation until 1907. The community has the nickname of James "Bacon Jim" English, a local politician.

References

Unincorporated communities in Moniteau County, Missouri
Unincorporated communities in Missouri
Jefferson City metropolitan area